Wolf-Heinrich Julius Otto Bernhard Fritz Hermann Ferdinand Graf von Helldorff (14 October 1896 – 15 August 1944) was an SA-Obergruppenführer, German police official and politician. He served as a member of the Landtag of Prussia during the Weimar Republic, as a member of the Reichstag for the Nazi Party from 1933, and as Ordnungspolizei Police President in Potsdam and in Berlin. From 1938 he became involved with the anti-Nazi resistance, and was executed in 1944 for his role in the 20th July plot to overthrow Adolf Hitler's regime.

Early life
Helldorff was born in Merseburg. A noble landowner's son, Helldorff was educated by private tutors in his youth, and then graduated from the gymnasium in Wernigerode in 1914. He volunteered for military service with the 12th Thuringian Hussars headquartered in Torgau. He served on both the western front and the eastern front in the First World War, attaining the rank of Leutnant and earning the Iron Cross first and second class. After the war, he was a member of the right-wing Freikorps, seeing service with both the Freikorps Lutzow and Roßbach in 1919 and 1920. From 1920 to 1924 he was a member of the nationalist paramilitary organisation Stahlhelm.

He became a member of the National Socialist Freedom Movement (NSFB) in 1924, which served as a legal front for the National Socialist German Workers' Party (NSDAP), which had been banned after the Beer Hall Putsch, and he also joined its paramilitary force, the Frontbann. He was elected to the Landtag of Prussia in 1924 on the NSFB list, representing constituency 11 (Regierungsbezirk Merseburg) until 1928.

Nazi career
Helldorf formally joined the Nazi Party on 1 August 1930 (membership number 325,408) and in January 1931 he joined the Sturmabteilung (SA). By July he became the leader of SA-Gruppe Greater Berlin with the rank of SA-Oberführer and, later that year, for all of Brandenburg. The scope of his work expanded when he was also given responsibility for the leadership of the Schutzstaffel (SS) in Brandenburg. On Sep 12, 1931, von Helldorff organizes a riot at Kurfürstendamm, about a thousand men appeared from within the crowd on the streets and start attacking people who they think are Jewish, scream at them and then they beat them, scream anti-Jewish threats at them.

In April 1932 Helldorff was returned to the Prussian Landtag as a member of the Nazi Party, this time representing constituency 3 (Potsdam II). In September 1932 he was promoted to SA-Gruppenführer and made leader of SA-Obergruppe I, commanding multiple SA Gruppe covering all northeast Germany.

After the Nazi seizure of power, Helldorff was made Police President of Potsdam on 25 March 1933. In November 1933, he was also elected to the Reichstag. He remained in Potsdam until being named Police President of Berlin on 19 July 1935. In December 1935, he was made a member of the Prussian Provincial Council (Provinzialrat).

In his new post, Helldorff was closely allied with Joseph Goebbels, Gauleiter of Berlin and Reich Minister of Public Enlightenment and Propaganda. As chief of the Berlin police, Helldorff played an instrumental role in the harassment and plundering of Berlin's Jewish population in the early and the mid-1930s. In his diary entry of 19 June 1936, Goebbels commented: "Helldorff is now proceeding radically on the Jewish question ... many arrests ... We will free Berlin of Jews." Goebbels noted on 2 July 1938, that "Helldorff wants to construct a Jewish ghetto in Berlin. The rich Jews will be required to fund its construction." Helldorff was the organizational brains behind the arson and looting of Berlin's synagogues and Jewish businesses in the November pogroms 1938. On 8 November 1938, the day that November pogroms began, he was quoted in The New York Times as saying: "as a result of a police activity in the last few weeks the entire Jewish population of Berlin had been disarmed".
On 9 November 1938, Helldorff was promoted to SA-Obergruppenführer. Though never officially a member of the SS, owing to his position as a Police President, he was authorized to wear the uniform of a General der Polizei, (a rank equivalent to an Obergruppenführer in the SS.) Helldorff was additionally named as the Higher Police Leader of Greater Berlin in 1943.

20 July plot

It is asserted that Helldorff was in some form of communication with the military opposition to Hitler as early as 1938. Goebbels certainly ensured that Helldorf took the blame for the November pogroms by declaring "the police act with an appearance of legality, the party provides spectators". The police took orders not to arrest or to treat too harshly rioters who beat up Jews.

In contrast, Hans Gisevius's book To the Bitter End described as Helldorff playing an important role in a circle of conspirators and anti-Nazis. On 20 July 1944, he was in communication with the coup d'état plotters attempting to assassinate the Führer. His planned role would be to keep the police from interfering with the military takeover and then to aid the new government.

Trial and execution
For his involvement in the 20 July plot to assassinate Hitler at the Wolf's Lair in East Prussia, Helldorff was arrested on 24 July and, under interrogation by the Gestapo, confessed his role in the plot. Expelled from the Party on 8 August and from the Reichstag two days later, he was put on trial and condemned by Roland Freisler at the People's Court on 15 August. He was put to death at Plötzensee Prison that same day. So enraged was Hitler at Helldorff's participation in the plot that he insisted Helldorff be forced to watch his fellow conspirators being hanged before his own execution.

Personal indebtedness
Helldorff was friends with the stage magician and psychic Erik Jan Hanussen, who constantly lent him money for his debts. "The count was always in debt, and his private life was a wreck. He was separated from his wife and was on bad terms with his mother after welching on his promise to pay her rent. Sometimes he was behind in his own rent. On one occasion he 'forgot' to pay for a new Mercedes. And he was always late paying his personal tailor and the trainer he hired for his racehorse. There were other debts as well, all from a gambling habit Helldorff couldn't shake. Luckily, he could always count on a handout from Hanussen. All he had to do was sign an IOU, which Hanussen would add to his growing pile of chits he kept safe in his apartment".

Career summary

 2 August 1914 – Spring 1918: Service on Western and Eastern Fronts
 1919: Service with Freikorps Lützow, involved in fighting against communist uprisings in Brunswick, Jena and Munich
 1919–1920: Leader of Offiziers-Stoßtrupp in Freikorps Roßbach, which participated in the Kapp Putsch of 13 March 1920
 1919–1924: Member of Der Stahlhelm
 August 1924: Joined the Frontbann
 7 December 1924 – 3 March 1928: Member of the Landtag of Prussia.
 1 May 1925 – 22 September 1925: Commander of the Frontbann
 1 August 1930: Joined the NSDAP, member number 325,408
 January 1931: Joined the Sturmabteilung (SA)
 24 7 April 1932 – 14 October 1933: Member of the Landtag of Prussia.
 25 March 1933 – 18 July 1935: Police President in Potsdam
 2 November 1933 – 10 August 1944: Member of the Reichstag
 19 July 1935 – 24 July 1944: Police President in Berlin

Awards and decorations

 1939 Clasp to the Iron Cross 2nd Class and 1st Class
 1914 Iron Cross 2nd Class and 1st Class
 Honour Chevron for the Old Guard, 1934
 The Honour Cross of the World War 1914/1918 with Swords, 1934
 Golden Party Badge, 1938
 War Merit Cross 2nd Class with Swords and 1st Class with Swords
 Nazi Party Long Service Award in bronze and silver

Notes

References

Further reading
 Gisevius, Hans Bernd, To the Bitter End, Translated from German by Richard and Clara Winston, Houghton Mifflin, Boston, 1947 Reprinted 2009.

External links
 
 

1896 births
1944 deaths
Holocaust perpetrators in Germany
20th-century Freikorps personnel
People from Saxony-Anhalt executed at Plötzensee Prison
Prussian politicians
Members of the Landtag of Prussia
People from Merseburg
People from the Province of Saxony
German police chiefs
Executed members of the 20 July plot
Nazi Party officials
Counts of Germany
Sturmabteilung officers
SS-Obergruppenführer
Members of the Reichstag of Nazi Germany
National Socialist Freedom Movement politicians
People executed by hanging at Plötzensee Prison
Nazis executed by Nazi Germany
Nazis executed by hanging
Prussian Army personnel
Nobility in the Nazi Party
Recipients of the Iron Cross (1914), 1st class
Recipients of the Knights Cross of the War Merit Cross
Nazi Party politicians
Kapp Putsch participants
German nationalists
German Army personnel of World War I